Marcie Berman Ries (born August 25, 1950) is an American diplomat who served as the United States Ambassador to Bulgaria.

Career
A specialist in national security issues and arms control, Ries worked as the Director of the Office of United Nations Political Affairs from 2001 to 2003, and then served as the Chief of Mission in Pristina, Kosovo from 2003 to 2004.

In 2005, she was appointed as American ambassador to Albania, and held that position until 2007.  She left Albania in 2007 to become the Minister-Counselor for Political-Military Affairs in Iraq.

Upon returning to Washington, D.C., she became the Principal Deputy Assistant Secretary for European and Eurasian Affairs at the U.S. Department of State, and then went on to serve as the Deputy Assistant Secretary for Nuclear and Strategic Policy.

Life
Ries obtained her Bachelor's from Oberlin College, and her master's degree from the School of Advanced International Studies at Johns Hopkins University. She is married to Charles P. Ries, a former U.S. ambassador to Greece.

References

External links 

|-

|-

1950 births
Living people
People from Boston
Oberlin College alumni
Paul H. Nitze School of Advanced International Studies alumni
American women ambassadors
Ambassadors of the United States to Albania
Ambassadors of the United States to Bulgaria
United States Foreign Service personnel
21st-century American diplomats
21st-century American women